The 2015 Australia Day Honours were announced on 26 January 2015 by the Governor General of Australia, Sir Peter Cosgrove.

The Australia Day Honours are the first of the two major annual honours lists, announced on Australia Day (26 January), with the other being the Queen's Birthday Honours which are announced on the second Monday in June.

Order of Australia

Knight of the Order of Australia (AK)

General Division

Companion of the Order of Australia (AC)

General Division

Officer of the Order of Australia (AO)

General Division

Military Division

Member of the Order of Australia (AM)

General Division

Military Division

Medal of the Order of Australia (OAM)

General Division

Military Division

Meritorious Service

Public Service Medal (PSM)

Australian Police Medal (APM)

Australian Fire Service Medal (AFSM)

Ambulance Service Medal (ASM)

Emergency Services Medal (ESM)

Distinguished Service

Medal for Gallantry (MG)

Commendation for Gallantry

Bar to the Distinguished Service Cross (DSC and Bar)

Distinguished Service Cross (DSC)

Bar to the Distinguished Service Medal (DSM and Bar)

Distinguished Service Medal (DSM)

Commendation for Distinguished Service

Conspicuous Service Cross (CSC)

Conspicuous Service Medal (CSM)

Meritorious Unit Citation

References

External links
Australian Honours Lists, www.gg.gov.au
Australia Day 2015 Honours List, www.gg.gov.au
Australian Gazettes
S1 - Order of Australia, www.gg.gov.au
S2 - Meritorious Service, www.gg.gov.au
S3 - Distinguished and Conspicuous Service, www.gg.gov.au
Biographical notes
Knight (AK) in the General Division of the Order of Australia, www.gg.gov.au
Companion (AC) in the General Division of the Order of Australia, www.gg.gov.au
Officer (AO) in the General Division of the Order of Australia, www.gg.gov.au
Officer (AO) in the Military Division of the Order of Australia, www.gg.gov.au
Member (AM) in the General Division of the Order of Australia (A-L), www.gg.gov.au
Member (AM) in the General Division of the Order of Australia (M-Z), www.gg.gov.au
Member (AM) in the Military Division of the Order of Australia, www.gg.gov.au
Medal (OAM) of the Order of Australia in the General Division (A-E), www.gg.gov.au
Medal (OAM) of the Order of Australia in the General Division (F-L), www.gg.gov.au
Medal (OAM) of the Order of Australia in the General Division (M-R) , www.gg.gov.au
Medal (OAM) of the Order of Australia in the General Division (S-Z) , www.gg.gov.au
Medal (OAM) of the Order of Australia in the Military Division , www.gg.gov.au
Meritorious, www.gg.gov.au
Gallantry, Distinguished and Conspicuous, www.gg.gov.au

2015 awards in Australia
Orders, decorations, and medals of Australia